Callancyla capixaba is a species of beetle in the family Cerambycidae. It was described by Monné in 1997.

References

Trachyderini
Beetles described in 1997